The Women's Table is a 1993 sculpture by Maya Lin in front of Sterling Memorial Library at Yale University.

References 

 
 
 
 
 
 
 https://books.google.com/books?id=F3vDU-_uA0AC&pg=PA138

External links 

 

1993 sculptures
Artworks at Yale University
1993 establishments in Connecticut
Granite sculptures in Connecticut
Buildings and structures in New Haven, Connecticut